The Steve Wilkos Show is a syndicated American tabloid talk show hosted by Steve Wilkos. The series is a spin-off of the long-running Jerry Springer show. The Steve Wilkos Show debuted on September 10, 2007, two months after Wilkos' departure as director of security on Jerry Springer.

Description
The Steve Wilkos show is a spin-off from the 'Steve to the Rescue''' segments on Jerry Springer. Some of the topics he covers include adultery, domestic abuse, child molestation, paternity, disrespectful children, and teenage pregnancy.

Polygraph exams are commonly used on the show as a means of resolving issues, despite inconclusive evidence on their effectiveness/accuracy. Daniel Ribacoff, a polygraph expert, is commonly featured on the show to explicate polygraph results.

 History 
Wilkos has appeared twice on Maury; the first time was in 2008, and the second was when he appeared on the 2,500th episode in 2013.

On November 22, 2013, The Steve Wilkos Show celebrated its 1000th episode, along with Jerry Springer and Rachelle Wilkos as special guests. The 1,000th episode took a look back on the first seven seasons of the show.The Steve Wilkos Show celebrated its tenth anniversary in September 2016. Steve Wilkos and Rachelle Wilkos, as well as the producers, hosted a series of tributes entitled "A Decade of Steve", looking back on the first nine seasons of the show.

In 2020 during the COVID-19 pandemic, the talk show was recorded an in studio audience due to social distancing regulations, while only a certain number of guests were allowed to be at the studio in person and others joined virtually (via video chat). On November 9, 2021, Wilkos announced on social media that his show is finally allowing live audiences to be at the studio again.

Format changes
In the second season, Wilkos began dividing some episodes into two segments, each one dealing with different guests and issues. In rare cases, there can be three segments on one episode. Additionally, paternity tests and infidelity were added as topics to the show.  As time went on with the paternity and infidelity stories, Wilkos would often make jokes with guests just to get laughs from himself, his guests and the audience, since paternity and infidelity are not as serious an offense as abuse of any kind.

According to the Chicago Sun-Times, executive producer Richard Dominick was forced from the program by Jerry Springer and NBCU Domestic Television after encouraging Wilkos to become extremely physical with a guest. Rachelle Wilkos, Wilkos's wife and a long time Jerry Springer crew member, became the program's executive producer. Steve Wilkos admitted to being dissatisfied with the show's first season, saying "All I did was yell at everybody and throw people off the stage. There was no level of emotion -- just hardcore yelling." Upon his wife taking over, she encouraged him to be himself and go with his "gut."

Wilkos' third season premiered September 14, 2009, originating from the Stamford Media Center in Stamford, Connecticut. Production of the show had relocated from Chicago to Stamford earlier that year, complete with a new studio. Fellow NBC-Universal talkers Maury and Jerry Springer made the move, as well.

In May 2022, it was announced that The Steve Wilkos Show had been renewed for a sixteenth season.

Notable episodes

Some episodes of the show have led to guests being arrested or convicted of crimes:
 In November 2011, Norwich, Connecticut police arrested Burke Bergman after he failed a lie detector test about sexually molesting his son, in the episode "Three Possible Dads, One Possible Molester" aired on September 19, 2011.
 Five months following the October 3, 2012 episode "Did You Rape My Daughter?", guest Shaun Whitt was arrested in Flagler County, Florida on charges of raping his then-11-year-old step-daughter beginning in 2010.  In September 2014, Whitt was convicted of two counts of sexual battery against a child and sentenced to life in prison plus 30 years.
 The May 6, 2015 episode "Did You Violate Our Trust...and Our Children?" led to the arrest of 22-year-old Dameion McBride in Kansas City, Missouri for sexually abusing three children. McBride was convicted in late 2016 and sentenced to 10 years in prison.
 Nearly a week after the May 15, 2017 broadcast of the episode "Horrific Child Abuse Caught on Video", police in Waynesboro, Pennsylvania arrested 21-year-old Jessica Lynn Samick on two charges including felony endangering the welfare of a child. She is suspected of beating and burning a one-year-old boy whom she was babysitting.
 On October 25, 2019 two days after the episode "He Was Brutally Beating Your Three-Year-Old: Why Didn't You Stop it?" was taped, guest Samantha Delcamp was arrested for her part in the beating death of her daughter Arabella Parker. Her ex-boyfriend Jahrid Burgess severely beat Arabella while Delcamp did nothing to protect her. Burgess was sentenced to 24 to 50 years while Delcamp was sentenced to 12 to 25 years.

Ratings
The show's first season had the highest rated premiere of fall 2007, with a Nielsen rating of 1.1. From 2007 to 2014, the show had the highest ratings growth out of any syndicated talk show, especially among households and women aged 25 to 54. In November 2014, the show had a Nielsen rating of 1.5, with an estimated 1.8 million daily viewers. As of March 2020, the show averaged a 1.0 Nielsen rating, with 1.4 million daily viewers according to NBCU.

See also

 Kenny Easterday
 Jerry Springer: The Opera The Jeremy Kyle Show'' (UK version)
 The Jeremy Kyle Show (U.S. TV series)
 Face to Face

References

External links

2007 American television series debuts
2000s American television talk shows
2010s American television talk shows
2020s American television talk shows
English-language television shows
First-run syndicated television programs in the United States
Chicago television shows
Television series by Universal Television
American television spin-offs
Culture of Stamford, Connecticut
Television shows filmed in Connecticut